Beaverdam Creek is a  long 2nd order tributary to Richardson Creek in Union County, North Carolina.

Course
Beaverdam Creek rises in a pond about 0.25 miles northeast of Roughedge, North Carolina and then flows north and turns east to join Richardson Creek in about 1.5 miles south of Monroe, North Carolina.

Watershed
Beaverdam Creek drains  of area, receives about 48.4 in/year of precipitation, has a wetness index of 452.99, and is about 38% forested.

References

Rivers of North Carolina
Rivers of Union County, North Carolina